Shepshed Cutting is a   geological Site of Special Scientific Interest west of Shepshed in Leicestershire. 

The Triassic deposits in Shepshed Cutting are unique, with a flat sheet of galena resting on red clay, and the whole enclosed in sandstone. The site is described by Natural England as "of international importance for developing a better understanding of the origins of mineral deposits and the processes which form them".

A public footpath runs through the site.

References

Sites of Special Scientific Interest in Leicestershire
Shepshed